Mark Costello (born October 24, 1961) is the Iowa State Senator from the 8th District. A Republican, he has served in the Iowa Senate since being elected in 2014. He had also previously served in the Iowa House of Representatives from 2013–2014.

Biography 

Costello was born in Omaha, Nebraska but moved to Imogene, Iowa as a kid. He graduated from Nishna Valley High School before going on to attend the University of Northern Iowa, receiving a B.A. in computer information systems.

After college Costello worked five years as a computer analyst with Garst Seed Company based in Coon Rapids before eventually returning to work on his family farm.

He and his wife Rachel were married in 2001. They have five children and currently reside on their family farm in Mills County.

Iowa House of Representatives 

Mark Costello (R-Imogene) was first elected to the Iowa House in 2012 representing the 23rd District.

Mark served as Vice Chair of the Iowa House Health & Human Resources Budget Subcommittee. His other committee assignments of the 85th General Assembly include Human Resources, State Government, Veterans Affairs, and Labor.

Iowa Senate 

He won the December 30, 2014 special election to replace Joni Ernst in the Iowa State Senate after she was elected to the U.S. Senate. Ernst's predecessor in the 12th Senate district, Kim Reynolds, also went on to be elected statewide as Governor.

As of February 2020, Costello serves on the following committees: Ethics (Chair), Agriculture, Appropriations, Human Resources, and Veterans Affairs. He also serves on the Health and Human Services Appropriations Subcommittee (Chair), as well as the Health Policy Oversight Committee, Administrative Rules Review Committee, and the Medical Assistance Advisory Council.

Electoral history

References 

University of Northern Iowa alumni
Republican Party members of the Iowa House of Representatives
Republican Party Iowa state senators
Living people
People from Fremont County, Iowa
Place of birth missing (living people)
1961 births
21st-century American politicians